The Elements of Theology is a work on Neoplatonic philosophy written by Proclus. Conceived of as a systematic summary of Neoplatonic metaphysics, it has often served as a general introduction to this subject.

Contents
The Elements of Theology is a compendium of 211 propositions that presents a concise systematization of Neoplatonic philosophy, with no attempt at radical innovation. Proclus uses the term 'theology' as in the study of the 'first principles' of all things. The propositions can be informally halved into dual parts, the first, establish the unity of the many in the One, causality, participation, gradiation, procession, infinitude and eternity. The second half; on the henads, intelligences and souls.

Legacy
Falsely attributed to Aristotle, this work was in turn translated into Latin in the 12th century by Gerhard of Cremona under the name . Translations of the  into Armenian and Hebrew also exist. Another way in which the Elements of Theology found its way into medieval Aristotelian philosophy is through the portions of the book that were interspersed in Arabic translations of works by the Peripatetic philosopher Alexander of Aphrodisias.

In the Byzantine world, the Elements of Theology was studied in its original Greek by Michael Psellos (11th century) and translated into Georgian by Psellos' pupil Ioanne Petritsi, who also wrote a commentary on it. A Christian refutation of the work was written by the bishop Nicolaus of Methone in the 12th century.

As such, it had also become a standard part of the university curriculum in the 13th century.

William of Moerbeke's Latin translations of Proclus' works were not widely read in the Middle Ages, though in the 14th century a Latin commentary on the Elements of Theology was written by Berthold of Moosburg. The  was also still used by Dante, who probably drew upon this work for the Neoplatonic ideas in his Divine Comedy.

See also 
Theology of Aristotle, another Arabic adaptation of a Neoplatonic work (Plotinus' Enneads) falsely attributed to Aristotle

References

Sources cited

 (in 2 volumes)

External links
 Proclus' Elements of Theology, English translation by Thomas Taylor published in 1816
 

Pagan anti-Gnosticism
Metaphysics literature